CPD Llannefydd FC  is a Welsh football team based in Llannefydd, Conwy County Borough.  The team currently play in the North Wales Coast East Football League Premier Division, which is at the fourth tier of the Welsh football league system.

History
The club was formed in 1998 and the most notable season was 2016–17, when they won the Vale of Clwyd and Conwy Football League Premier Division title, Premier Cup and Premier Auxiliary Cup and just missed out on a quadruple when losing in the President's Cup Final to Abergele. They were promoted to the Welsh Alliance League Division Two where their best finish was as runner-up at the end of the 2019–20 season. The club then joined the North Wales Coast East Football League as part of the restructure of the Welsh football pyramid.

Honours
Welsh Alliance League Division Two – Runners-up: 2019–20
Vale of Clwyd and Conwy Football League Premier Division – Champions: 2016–17
Vale of Clwyd and Conwy Football League Premier Division – Runners-up: 2015–16
Vale of Clwyd and Conwy Football League Division One – Runners-up: 2011–12
Premier Auxiliary Cup – Winners: 2012–13, 2013–14, 2016–17
Premier Auxiliary Cup – Runners-up: 2014–15
Normal Precision Premier Cup – Winners: 2016–17
President's Cup – Winners: 2015–16
President's Cup – Runners-up: 2016–17

External links
Club official Twitter
Club official Facebook

References

Welsh Alliance League clubs
North Wales Coast Football League clubs
Association football clubs established in 1998
1998 establishments in Wales
Sport in Conwy County Borough
Vale of Clwyd and Conwy Football League clubs